The Colorado Rockies' 1996 season was the fourth for the Rockies. Managed by Don Baylor, they played home games at Coors Field and finished with a record of 83-79, third in the NL West.

Offseason
November 20, 1995: Joe Girardi was traded by the Colorado Rockies to the New York Yankees for Mike DeJean.
December 18, 1995: Jeff Reed was signed as a free agent by the Colorado Rockies.

Regular season
The only no-hitter at Coors Field was thrown by Hideo Nomo of the Los Angeles Dodgers on September 17, 1996.
On May 11, 1996, Al Leiter threw the first no-hitter in Florida Marlins history. The Marlins beat the Rockies by a score of 11-0.

Season standings

Record vs. opponents

Game log

|- bgcolor="ccffcc"
| 1 || April 2 || @ Phillies || 5–3 || Ritz (1–0) || Fernandez || — || 36,751 || 1–0
|- bgcolor="ffbbbb"
| 2 || April 3 || @ Phillies || 1–3 || Grace || Freeman (0–1) || Bottalico || 15,648 || 1–1
|- bgcolor="ffbbbb"
| 3 || April 4 || @ Phillies || 4–7 || Mulholland || Rekar (0–1) || Bottalico || 16,220 || 1–2
|- bgcolor="ffbbbb"
| 4 || April 5 || @ Expos || 4–6 || Dyer || Munoz (0–1) || Rojas || 45,042 || 1–3
|- bgcolor="ccffcc"
| 5 || April 6 || @ Expos || 5–4 || Thompson (1–0) || Rueter || Leskanic (1) || 27,040 || 2–3
|- bgcolor="ffbbbb"
| 6 || April 7 || @ Expos || 1–9 || Fassero || Painter (0–1) || — || 11,212 || 2–4
|- bgcolor="ffbbbb"
| 7 || April 8 || Cubs || 6–9 || Adams || Ritz (1–1) || Jones || 50,185 || 2–5
|- bgcolor="ccffcc"
| 8 || April 10 || Cubs || 10–9 || Leskanic (1–0) || Jones || — || 50,083 || 3–5
|- bgcolor="ccffcc"
| 9 || April 11 || Mets || 7–3 || Reynoso (1–0) || Mlicki || — || 48,010 || 4–5
|- bgcolor="ccffcc"
| 10 || April 12 || Mets || 6–5 || Freeman (1–1) || Clark || Leskanic (2) || 50,045 || 5–5
|- bgcolor="ffbbbb"
| 11 || April 14 || Mets || 4–10 || Harnisch || Ritz (1–2) || Henry || 48,051 || 5–6
|- bgcolor="ccffcc"
| 12 || April 15 || Padres || 11–9 || Ruffin (1–0) || Blair || Leskanic (3) || 48,027 || 6–6
|- bgcolor="ffbbbb"
| 13 || April 16 || Padres || 6–10 || Ashby || Reynoso (1–1) || — || 48,031 || 6–7
|- bgcolor="ffbbbb"
| 14 || April 17 || Padres || 6–11 || Florie || Freeman (1–2) || — || 48,011 || 6–8
|- bgcolor="ccffcc"
| 15 || April 19 || @ Mets || 5–3 || Ritz (2–2) || Harnisch || Leskanic (4) || 16,225 || 7–8
|- bgcolor="ffbbbb"
| 16 || April 20 || @ Mets || 3–4 (10) || Franco || Habyan (0–1) || — || 20,847 || 7–9
|- bgcolor="ccffcc"
| 17 || April 21 || @ Mets || 6–4 || Leskanic (2–0) || Franco || — || 22,737 || 8–9
|- bgcolor="ccffcc"
| 18 || April 22 || @ Cubs || 4–2 || Freeman (2–2) || Navarro || Leskanic (5) || 21,227 || 9–9
|- bgcolor="ccffcc"
| 19 || April 23 || @ Cubs || 4–3 || Rekar (1–1) || Castillo || Leskanic (6) || 14,325 || 10–9
|- bgcolor="ffbbbb"
| 20 || April 24 || Phillies || 8–10 || Borland || Reed (0–1) || Bottalico || 48,047 || 10–10
|- bgcolor="ffbbbb"
| 21 || April 25 || Phillies || 1–7 || Fernandez || Thompson (1–1) || Ryan || 48,033 || 10–11
|- bgcolor="ffbbbb"
| 22 || April 26 || Expos || 2–6 || Alvarez || Reynoso (1–2) || — || 48,024 || 10–12
|- bgcolor="ccffcc"
| 23 || April 27 || Expos || 6–5 (13) || Painter (1–1) || Daal || — || 48,013 || 11–12
|- bgcolor="ffbbbb"
| 24 || April 28 || Expos || 9–21 || Rueter || Rekar (1–2) || — || 48,006 || 11–13
|- bgcolor="ffbbbb"
| 25 || April 30 || @ Dodgers || 4–7 || Nomo || Ritz (2–3) || Worrell || 31,037 || 11–14
|-

|- bgcolor="ccffcc"
| 26 || May 1 || @ Dodgers || 4–1 || Thompson (2–1) || Astacio || Ruffin (1) || 30,377 || 12–14
|- bgcolor="ccffcc"
| 27 || May 3 || Marlins || 9–5 || Reynoso (2–2) || Burkett || — || 48,129 || 13–14
|- bgcolor="ccffcc"
| 28 || May 4 || Marlins || 17–5 || Freeman (3–2) || Hammond || — || 48,101 || 14–14
|- bgcolor="ccffcc"
| 29 || May 5 || Marlins || 5–4 || Ritz (3–3) || Perez || — || 48,134 || 15–14
|- bgcolor="ffbbbb"
| 30 || May 6 || @ Braves || 1–4 || Avery || Thompson (2–2) || — || 28,725 || 15–15
|- bgcolor="ffbbbb"
| 31 || May 7 || @ Braves || 5–6 (10) || Clontz || Leskanic (2–1) || — || 29,976 || 15–16
|- bgcolor="ffbbbb"
| 32 || May 8 || @ Braves || 1–5 || Glavine || Reynoso (2–3) || — || 29,363 || 15–17
|- bgcolor="ffbbbb"
| 33 || May 9 || @ Marlins || 2–6 || Miller || Freeman (3–3) || — || 21,008 || 15–18
|- bgcolor="ffbbbb"
| 34 || May 10 || @ Marlins || 2–4 || Rapp || Ritz (3–4) || Nen || 27,309 || 15–19
|- bgcolor="ffbbbb"
| 35 || May 11 || @ Marlins || 0–11 || Leiter || Thompson (2–3) || — || 31,549 || 15–20
|- bgcolor="ffbbbb"
| 36 || May 12 || @ Marlins || 5–7 || Nen || Leskanic (2–2) || — || 21,058 || 15–21
|- bgcolor="ccffcc"
| 37 || May 14 || @ Reds || 5–3 || Reed (1–1) || Schourek || Ruffin (2) || 20,535 || 16–21
|- bgcolor="ccffcc"
| 38 || May 17 || Cardinals || 12–11 || Leskanic (3–2) || Bailey || Ruffin (3) || 48,074 || 17–21
|- bgcolor="ccffcc"
| 39 || May 18 || Cardinals || 9–8 || Habyan (1–1) || Eckersley || — || 48,103 || 18–21
|- bgcolor="ccffcc"
| 40 || May 19 || Cardinals || 10–3 || Thompson (3–3) || Benes || — || 48,075 || 19–21
|- bgcolor="ccffcc"
| 41 || May 20 || Pirates || 10–7 || Reynoso (3–3) || Neagle || — || 48,042 || 20–21
|- bgcolor="ccffcc"
| 42 || May 21 || Pirates || 12–10 || Holmes (1–0) || Christiansen || Ruffin (4) || 48,037 || 21–21
|- bgcolor="ccffcc"
| 43 || May 22 || Pirates || 6–3 || Ritz (4–4) || Smith || Ruffin (5) || 48,044 || 22–21
|- bgcolor="ffbbbb"
| 44 || May 23 || Reds || 5–7 || Carrasco || Ruffin (1–1) || Brantley || 48,040 || 22–22
|- bgcolor="ffbbbb"
| 45 || May 24 || Reds || 9–11 || Ruffin || Thompson (3–4) || — || 48,019 || 22–23
|- bgcolor="ccffcc"
| 46 || May 25 || Reds || 7–5 || Leskanic (4–2) || Moore || — || 48,012 || 23–23
|- bgcolor="ccffcc"
| 47 || May 27 || @ Cardinals || 5–2 || Ritz (5–4) || Stottlemyre || Ruffin (6) || 38,804 || 24–23
|- bgcolor="ccffcc"
| 48 || May 28 || @ Cardinals || 6–5 || Painter (2–1) || Mathews || Holmes (1) || 26,913 || 25–23
|- bgcolor="ffbbbb"
| 49 || May 29 || @ Cardinals || 5–6 || Petkovsek || Leskanic (4–3) || Benes || 27,856 || 25–24
|- bgcolor="ffbbbb"
| 50 || May 31 || @ Pirates || 4–8 || Neagle || Reynoso (3–4) || Cordova || 26,640 || 25–25
|-

|- bgcolor="ccffcc"
| 51 || June 1 || @ Pirates || 2–0 || Ritz (6–4) || Wagner || Ruffin (7) || 15,633 || 26–25
|- bgcolor="ffbbbb"
| 52 || June 2 || @ Pirates || 2–5 || Smith || Holmes (1–1) || Cordova || 26,745 || 26–26
|- bgcolor="ffbbbb"
| 53 || June 3 || @ Pirates || 2–7 || Ruebel || Farmer (0–1) || — || 8,120 || 26–27
|- bgcolor="ffbbbb"
| 54 || June 4 || @ Astros || 8–16 || Hampton || Thompson (3–5) || — || 18,418 || 26–28
|- bgcolor="ffbbbb"
| 55 || June 5 || @ Astros || 1–4 || Wall || Reynoso (3–5) || — || 14,954 || 26–29
|- bgcolor="ccffcc"
| 56 || June 6 || @ Astros || 14–7 || Ritz (7–4) || Drabek || — || 22,112 || 27–29
|- bgcolor="ccffcc"
| 57 || June 7 || Braves || 19–8 || Painter (3–1) || Bielecki || — || 48,027 || 28–29
|- bgcolor="ccffcc"
| 58 || June 8 || Braves || 13–12 || Holmes (2–1) || McMichael || Ruffin (8) || 48,015 || 29–29
|- bgcolor="ffbbbb"
| 59 || June 9 || Braves || 3–8 || Smoltz || Thompson (3–6) || — || 48,036 || 29–30
|- bgcolor="ffbbbb"
| 60 || June 10 || Astros || 9–10 || Wall || Reynoso (3–6) || — || 48,007 || 29–31
|- bgcolor="ccffcc"
| 61 || June 11 || Astros || 7–5 || Alston (1–0) || Young || Ruffin (9) || 48,014 || 30–31
|- bgcolor="ccffcc"
| 62 || June 12 || Astros || 8–0 || Freeman (4–3) || Reynolds || — || 48,024 || 31–31
|- bgcolor="ccffcc"
| 63 || June 13 || Phillies || 4–1 || Rekar (2–2) || Schilling || Ruffin (10) || 48,018 || 32–31
|- bgcolor="ccffcc"
| 64 || June 14 || Phillies || 10–6 || Painter (4–1) || Springer || — || 48,006 || 33–31
|- bgcolor="ccffcc"
| 65 || June 15 || Phillies || 4–2 || Reynoso (4–6) || Mulholland || Ruffin (11) || 48,023 || 34–31
|- bgcolor="ccffcc"
| 66 || June 16 || Phillies || 11–3 || Ritz (8–4) || Munoz || — || 48,041 || 35–31
|- bgcolor="ffbbbb"
| 67 || June 17 || Expos || 3–5 || Urbina || Freeman (4–4) || Rojas || 48,021 || 35–32
|- bgcolor="ffbbbb"
| 68 || June 18 || Expos || 8–12 || Dyer || Holmes (2–2) || — || 50,025 || 35–33
|- bgcolor="ccffcc"
| 69 || June 19 || Expos || 7–6 (10) || Ruffin (2–1) || Scott || — || 48,007 || 36–33
|- bgcolor="ffbbbb"
| 70 || June 21 || @ Phillies || 3–4 (10) || Borland || Ruffin (2–2) || — || 25,085 || 36–34
|- bgcolor="ffbbbb"
| 71 || June 22 || @ Phillies || 4–5 || Blazier || Hawblitzel (0–1) || Bottalico || 28,604 || 36–35
|- bgcolor="ccffcc"
| 72 || June 23 || @ Phillies || 7–4 || Freeman (5–4) || Fernandez || Ruffin (12) || 33,385 || 37–35
|- bgcolor="ffbbbb"
| 73 || June 24 || @ Mets || 1–2 || Isringhausen || Holmes (2–3) || Franco || 16,988 || 37–36
|- bgcolor="ffbbbb"
| 74 || June 25 || @ Mets || 2–3 || Jones || Thompson (3–7) || Franco || 18,251 || 37–37
|- bgcolor="ffbbbb"
| 75 || June 26 || @ Mets || 5–9 || Mlicki || Reed (1–2) || — || 20,675 || 37–38
|- bgcolor="ccffcc"
| 76 || June 27 || Dodgers || 13–1 || Ritz (9–4) || Astacio || — || 48,043 || 38–38
|- bgcolor="ccffcc"
| 77 || June 28 || Dodgers || 13–4 || Freeman (6–4) || Martinez || — || 48,025 || 39–38
|- bgcolor="ffbbbb"
| 78 || June 29 || Dodgers || 10–13 || Valdez || Rekar (2–3) || — || 48,009 || 39–39
|- bgcolor="ccffcc"
| 79 || June 30 || Dodgers || 16–15 || Ruffin (3–2) || Worrell || — || 48,103 || 40–39
|-

|- bgcolor="ffbbbb"
| 80 || July 1 || @ Giants || 6–9 || Juden || Painter (4–2) || Beck || 16,142 || 40–40
|- bgcolor="ffbbbb"
| 81 || July 2 || @ Giants || 1–5 || Gardner || Ritz (9–5) || — || 13,571 || 40–41
|- bgcolor="ccffcc"
| 82 || July 3 || @ Giants || 3–2 || Leskanic (5–3) || Beck || Ruffin (13) || 44,356 || 41–41
|- bgcolor="ffbbbb"
| 83 || July 4 || @ Dodgers || 4–9 || Valdez || Freeman (6–5) || — || 54,331 || 41–42
|- bgcolor="ffbbbb"
| 84 || July 5 || @ Dodgers || 1–8 || Nomo || Bailey (0–1) || — || 43,415 || 41–43
|- bgcolor="ffbbbb"
| 85 || July 6 || @ Dodgers || 2–3 || Osuna || Ruffin (3–3) || Worrell || 35,562 || 41–44
|- bgcolor="ccffcc"
| 86 || July 7 || @ Dodgers || 3–0 || Ritz (10–5) || Astacio || — || 38,269 || 42–44
|- bgcolor="ccffcc"
| 87 || July 11 || Padres || 8–5 (10) || Ruffin (4–3) || Hoffman || — || 45,703 || 43–44
|- bgcolor="ccffcc"
| 88 || July 12 || Padres || 13–12 || Holmes (3–3) || Blair || — || 48,053 || 44–44
|- bgcolor="ccffcc"
| 89 || July 13 || Padres || 11–6 || Ritz (11–5) || Sanders || — || 48,009 || 45–44
|- bgcolor="ccffcc"
| 90 || July 14 || Padres || 8–4 || Reynoso (5–6) || Valenzuela || — || 48,065 || 46–44
|- bgcolor="ccffcc"
| 91 || July 15 || Giants || 7–3 || Bailey (1–1) || Bourgeois || — || 48,032 || 47–44
|- bgcolor="ccffcc"
| 92 || July 16 || Giants || 5–3 || Freeman (7–5) || Leiter || Ruffin (14) || 49,035 || 48–44
|- bgcolor="ccffcc"
| 93 || July 17 || Giants || 4–3 || Wright (1–0) || Fernandez || Ruffin (15) || 48,453 || 49–44
|- bgcolor="ffbbbb"
| 94 || July 18 || @ Padres || 2–9 || Sanders || Ritz (11–6) || — || 24,212 || 49–45
|- bgcolor="ffbbbb"
| 95 || July 19 || @ Padres || 3–4 || Valenzuela || Reynoso (5–7) || Hoffman || 26,559 || 49–46
|- bgcolor="ccffcc"
| 96 || July 20 || @ Padres || 5–4 || Leskanic (6–3) || Bochtler || Ruffin (16) || 55,046 || 50–46
|- bgcolor="ffbbbb"
| 97 || July 21 || @ Padres || 0–2 || Tewksbury || Freeman (7–6) || Hoffman || 36,686 || 50–47
|- bgcolor="ccffcc"
| 98 || July 23 || Mets || 10–7 || Ruffin (5–3) || Henry || — || 48,016 || 51–47
|- bgcolor="ccffcc"
| 99 || July 23 || Mets || 11–10 || Reed (2–2) || Henry || — || 48,058 || 52–47
|- bgcolor="ccffcc"
| 100 || July 24 || Mets || 7–6 (10) || Leskanic (7–3) || Byrd || — || 48,061 || 53–47
|- bgcolor="ffbbbb"
| 101 || July 25 || Cubs || 8–10 || Bottenfield || Ruffin (5–4) || Patterson || 48,087 || 53–48
|- bgcolor="ffbbbb"
| 102 || July 26 || Cubs || 4–17 || Navarro || Freeman (7–7) || Adams || 48,062 || 53–49
|- bgcolor="ccffcc"
| 103 || July 27 || Cubs || 10–6 || Thompson (4–7) || Telemaco || — || 48,096 || 54–49
|- bgcolor="ffbbbb"
| 104 || July 28 || Cubs || 5–7 || Bullinger || Ritz (11–7) || Bottenfield || 48,073 || 54–50
|- bgcolor="ffbbbb"
| 105 || July 29 || @ Expos || 1–4 || Cormier || Wright (1–1) || Rojas || 19,115 || 54–51
|- bgcolor="ffbbbb"
| 106 || July 30 || @ Expos || 1–3 || Urbina || Reynoso (5–8) || Rojas || 17,071 || 54–52
|- bgcolor="ffbbbb"
| 107 || July 31 || @ Expos || 2–6 || Fassero || Bailey (1–2) || — || 23,663 || 54–53
|-

|- bgcolor="ffbbbb"
| 108 || August 1 || @ Cubs || 1–4 || Navarro || Thompson (4–8) || Patterson || 25,564 || 54–54
|- bgcolor="ccffcc"
| 109 || August 2 || @ Cubs || 7–2 || Ritz (12–7) || Telemaco || — || 34,186 || 55–54
|- bgcolor="ccffcc"
| 110 || August 3 || @ Cubs || 8–2 || Wright (2–1) || Bullinger || — || 40,460 || 56–54
|- bgcolor="ccffcc"
| 111 || August 4 || @ Cubs || 6–1 || Reynoso (6–8) || Castillo || — || 38,738 || 57–54
|- bgcolor="ffbbbb"
| 112 || August 5 || Marlins || 9–16 || Hutton || Freeman (7–8) || — || 48,313 || 57–55
|- bgcolor="ccffcc"
| 113 || August 6 || Marlins || 11–0 || Thompson (5–8) || Burkett || — || 48,339 || 58–55
|- bgcolor="ccffcc"
| 114 || August 7 || Marlins || 12–5 || Ritz (13–7) || Leiter || — || 48,622 || 59–55
|- bgcolor="ccffcc"
| 115 || August 9 || @ Braves || 6–4 || Wright (3–1) || Glavine || Ruffin (17) || 41,275 || 60–55
|- bgcolor="ccffcc"
| 116 || August 10 || @ Braves || 9–7 (10) || Reed (3–2) || Wohlers || Ruffin (18) || 46,064 || 61–55
|- bgcolor="ffbbbb"
| 117 || August 11 || @ Braves || 1–4 || Smoltz || Freeman (7–9) || Wohlers || 32,961 || 61–56
|- bgcolor="ffbbbb"
| 118 || August 13 || @ Marlins || 0–5 || Leiter || Ritz (13–8) || — || 26,256 || 61–57
|- bgcolor="ffbbbb"
| 119 || August 14 || @ Marlins || 1–2 || Brown || Leskanic (7–4) || Nen || 26,589 || 61–58
|- bgcolor="ffbbbb"
| 120 || August 15 || @ Marlins || 6–7 || Powell || Ruffin (5–5) || Nen || 21,723 || 61–59
|- bgcolor="ccffcc"
| 121 || August 16 || @ Reds || 8–4 || Reynoso (7–8) || Salkeld || — || 28,878 || 62–59
|- bgcolor="ffbbbb"
| 122 || August 17 || @ Reds || 3–5 || Smiley || Munoz (0–2) || Brantley || — || 62–60
|- bgcolor="ffbbbb"
| 123 || August 17 || @ Reds || 5–9 || Shaw || Reed (3–3) || — || 34,225 || 62–61
|- bgcolor="ffbbbb"
| 124 || August 18 || @ Reds || 4–9 || Jarvis || Ritz (13–9) || Shaw || 24,883 || 62–62
|- bgcolor="ccffcc"
| 125 || August 19 || @ Reds || 6–3 || Thompson (6–8) || Portugal || — || 22,670 || 63–62
|- bgcolor="ccffcc"
| 126 || August 20 || Cardinals || 5–4 (13) || Munoz (1–2) || Mathews || — || 48,126 || 64–62
|- bgcolor="ccffcc"
| 127 || August 21 || Cardinals || 10–2 || Reynoso (8–8) || Benes || — || 48,045 || 65–62
|- bgcolor="ccffcc"
| 128 || August 22 || Cardinals || 10–5 || Bailey (2–2) || Morgan || — || 48,086 || 66–62
|- bgcolor="ffbbbb"
| 129 || August 23 || Pirates || 3–5 || Lieber || Ritz (13–10) || Cordova || 48,038 || 66–63
|- bgcolor="ccffcc"
| 130 || August 24 || Pirates || 9–3 || Thompson (7–8) || Peters || — || 48,014 || 67–63
|- bgcolor="ccffcc"
| 131 || August 25 || Pirates || 13–9 || Munoz (2–2) || Wilkins || — || 48,139 || 68–63
|- bgcolor="ccffcc"
| 132 || August 26 || Reds || 9–5 (7) || Swift (1–0) || Jarvis || Bailey (1) || 48,093 || 69–63
|- bgcolor="ffbbbb"
| 133 || August 27 || Reds || 3–4 || Smiley || Reynoso (8–9) || Brantley || 50,046 || 69–64
|- bgcolor="ccffcc"
| 134 || August 28 || Reds || 10–9 || Ruffin (6–5) || Shaw || — || 48,057 || 70–64
|- bgcolor="ffbbbb"
| 135 || August 29 || Reds || 7–18 || Burba || Thompson (7–9) || — || 48,029 || 70–65
|- bgcolor="ffbbbb"
| 136 || August 30 || @ Cardinals || 4–7 || Benes || Wright (3–2) || Eckersley || 25,530 || 70–66
|- bgcolor="ffbbbb"
| 137 || August 31 || @ Cardinals || 1–2 || Benes || Bailey (2–3) || Eckersley || 35,804 || 70–67
|-

|- bgcolor="ffbbbb"
| 138 || September 1 || @ Cardinals || 6–15 || Petkovsek || Rekar (2–4) || — || 28,552 || 70–68
|- bgcolor="ccffcc"
| 139 || September 2 || @ Pirates || 8–3 || Ritz (14–10) || Loaiza || — || 9,513 || 71–68
|- bgcolor="ffbbbb"
| 140 || September 4 || @ Pirates || 2–5 || Lieber || Thompson (7–10) || Plesac || 10,081 || 71–69
|- bgcolor="ffbbbb"
| 141 || September 6 || @ Astros || 1–2 || Hernandez || Leskanic (7–5) || — || 20,932 || 71–70
|- bgcolor="ffbbbb"
| 142 || September 7 || @ Astros || 4–5 || Kile || Holmes (3–4) || Hudek || 37,213 || 71–71
|- bgcolor="ccffcc"
| 143 || September 8 || @ Astros || 5–2 || Reed (4–3) || Reynolds || Ruffin (19) || 31,316 || 72–71
|- bgcolor="ccffcc"
| 144 || September 9 || @ Astros || 4–2 || Ritz (15–10) || Wall || Ruffin (20) || 13,833 || 73–71
|- bgcolor="ccffcc"
| 145 || September 10 || Braves || 9–8 || Holmes (4–4) || Clontz || Ruffin (21) || 48,051 || 74–71
|- bgcolor="ccffcc"
| 146 || September 11 || Braves || 6–5 || Wright (4–2) || Neagle || Swift (1) || 48,091 || 75–71
|- bgcolor="ccffcc"
| 147 || September 12 || Braves || 16–8 || Burke (1–0) || Smoltz || — || 48,052 || 76–71
|- bgcolor="ccffcc"
| 148 || September 13 || Astros || 6–3 || Holmes (5–4) || Hernandez || Ruffin (22) || 48,049 || 77–71
|- bgcolor="ccffcc"
| 149 || September 14 || Astros || 7–3 || Ritz (16–10) || Wall || — || 48,132 || 78–71
|- bgcolor="ccffcc"
| 150 || September 15 || Astros || 11–4 || Thompson (8–10) || Drabek || — || 48,038 || 79–71
|- bgcolor="ffbbbb"
| 151 || September 16 || Dodgers || 4–6 || Valdez || Wright (4–3) || — || 48,013 || 79–72
|- bgcolor="ffbbbb"
| 152 || September 17 || Dodgers || 0–9 || Nomo || Swift (1–1) || — || 50,066 || 79–73
|- bgcolor="ccffcc"
| 153 || September 18 || Dodgers || 6–4 || Burke (2–0) || Astacio || Ruffin (23) || 50,053 || 80–73
|- bgcolor="ffbbbb"
| 154 || September 19 || @ Giants || 4–11 || VanLandingham || Ritz (16–11) || — || 10,994 || 80–74
|- bgcolor="ffbbbb"
| 155 || September 20 || @ Giants || 2–6 || Gardner || Thompson (8–11) || — || 15,734 || 80–75
|- bgcolor="ffbbbb"
| 156 || September 21 || @ Giants || 2–6 || Rueter || Wright (4–4) || — || 30,002 || 80–76
|- bgcolor="ffbbbb"
| 157 || September 22 || @ Giants || 3–7 || Soderstrom || Nied (0–1) || — || 30,826 || 80–77
|- bgcolor="ccffcc"
| 158 || September 24 || @ Padres || 5–4 (11) || Ruffin (7–5) || Hoffman || Swift (2) || 23,556 || 81–77
|- bgcolor="ccffcc"
| 159 || September 25 || @ Padres || 5–3 || Thompson (9–11) || Hamilton || Ruffin (24) || 32,706 || 82–77
|- bgcolor="ffbbbb"
| 160 || September 27 || Giants || 3–9 || Soderstrom || Nied (0–2) || — || 48,009 || 82–78
|- bgcolor="ffbbbb"
| 161 || September 28 || Giants || 5–8 || Carlson || Burke (2–1) || Beck || 48,042 || 82–79
|- bgcolor="ccffcc"
| 162 || September 29 || Giants || 12–3 || Ritz (17–11) || Watson || — || 48,162 || 83–79
|-

|-
| Legend:       = Win       = LossBold = Rockies team member

Detailed records

Notable transactions
June 4, 1996: Shawn Chacón was drafted by the Colorado Rockies in the 3rd round of the 1996 amateur draft. Player signed June 18, 1996.
July 30, 1996: Eric Anthony was purchased by the Colorado Rockies from the Cincinnati Reds.
August 21, 1996: Steve Decker was purchased by the Colorado Rockies from the San Francisco Giants.
August 31, 1996: Marvin Freeman was selected off waivers by the Chicago White Sox from the Colorado Rockies.

Major League debuts
Batters:
Angel Echevarria (Jul 15)
Neifi Pérez (Aug 31)
Alan Cockrell (Sep 7)
Terry Jones (Sep 9)
Pitchers:
Mike Farmer (May 4)
Garvin Alston (Jun 6)
Ryan Hawblitzel (Jun 9)
Jamey Wright (Jul 3)
John Burke (Aug 13)
Robbie Beckett (Sep 12)

Roster

Player stats

Batting

Starters by position 
Note: Pos = Position; G = Games played; AB = At bats; H = Hits; Avg. = Batting average; HR = Home runs; RBI = Runs batted in

Other batters 
Note: G = Games played; AB = At bats; H = Hits; Avg. = Batting average; HR = Home runs; RBI = Runs batted in

Pitching

Starting pitchers 
Note: G = Games pitched; IP = Innings pitched; W = Wins; L = Losses; ERA = Earned run average; SO = Strikeouts

Other pitchers 
Note: G = Games pitched; IP = Innings pitched; W = Wins; L = Losses; ERA = Earned run average; SO = Strikeouts

Relief pitchers 
Note: G = Games pitched; W = Wins; L = Losses; SV = Saves; ERA = Earned run average; SO = Strikeouts

Farm system

References

1996 Colorado Rockies at Baseball Reference
1996 Colorado Rockies team page at www.baseball-almanac.com

Colorado Rockies seasons
Colorado Rockies season
Colorado Rockies
1990s in Denver